Luo–Guang (羅廣方言) is a northern branch of Yue Chinese spoken in Guangxi province.

Dialects
Luoding dialect is representative. 
Luoding dialect
Zhaoqing dialect
Sihui dialect
Yangshan dialect
Lianzhou dialect
Lianshan dialect
Qingyuan dialect

Yue Chinese